Francisco Antonio Pinto y Díaz de la Puente (July 23, 1785 – July 18, 1858) was a Chilean politician who served as President of Chile between 1827 and 1829.

Early life
He was born in Santiago, the son of  Joaquín Pinto and Mercedes Díaz de la Puente. Pinto completed his early studies in the Convictorio Carolino, the best school in the country at the time, and then studied law at the Real Universidad de San Felipe, being admitted to practice on October 11, 1808.

In his youth he dedicated himself to commerce. According to the social norms of the time, he also became a militia officer in the "Regimiento del Rey" (King's regiment). In 1810, while in Lima, he heard of the formation of the Government Junta of the Kingdom, and immediately returned to the country, where he was charged with a diplomatic mission to Buenos Aires. After that successful first mission, he was sent to England, and then to other European countries, with the mission of gathering support for the independence movement. While in Europe he learnt of the news of the defeat of the Chilean army in the Battle of Rancagua and the recapture of Chile by the Spanish troops. He then returned to Argentina to cooperate in the formation of a new army.

Pinto married Luisa Garmendia Aldurralde and had two children, Aníbal Pinto, who would become President of Chile, and Enriqueta Pinto, future wife of President Manuel Bulnes. His grandnephew (and grandson of José Miguel Carrera), Ignacio Carrera Pinto, became a hero at the War of the Pacific.

Political career
In 1820 he finally returned to Chile. He was then sent by Bernardo O'Higgins to Peru, to help in the independence of that country. In 1824 he was named as Minister of Government and Foreign Affairs, and in 1825, Intendant of Coquimbo.

In 1827, due to the resignation of President Agustín Eyzaguirre, General Ramón Freire was elected president, while General Pinto was elected Vice President. When General Freire himself resigned on May 5, 1827, General Pinto took over the position as "Accidental President".  As such he participated in the drafting of the Constitution of 1828.

A new presidential election was called in May 1829.  General Pinto was the clear winner out of 9 candidates, with 118 electoral votes (29.06%), and was proclaimed elected on October 19.  Nevertheless, the onset of the Chilean Civil War of 1829 was at hand.

The problem that caused the revolution happened in the vice presidential election. The winner should have been the first runner-up, Francisco Ruiz-Tagle (98 electoral votes or 24.13%), or the second runner-up, General José Joaquín Prieto, (61 votes or 15.02%), both conservatives.  Nonetheless, Congress was controlled by the liberals and presided by Francisco Ramón Vicuña, also liberal. Arguing that no vice-presidential candidate had a majority, they selected Joaquín Vicuña, brother of the president of the senate, even though he only got 48 electoral votes (11.82%). That was all the excuse needed by the conservatives to rebel.

Pinto resigned the Presidency on November 2 (less than two weeks after his proclamation), an event that marked his retirement from public life. All his powers were assumed by the President of Congress, Francisco Ramón Vicuña, who was already acting as "Accidental President" since July 16, 1829, when Pinto had delegated his powers on him for the duration of the electoral campaign.

Cabinet

Pinto only returned to public life in 1841, as a congressman. The Liberal party proclaimed him as a candidate to the Presidency in the Chilean presidential elections of 1841, in opposition to his son in law, General Manuel Bulnes, who finally resulted elected. He did not participate in the campaign in any active form. Nonetheless he was elected a deputy for La Serena, and president of the chamber, on May 30, 1843. He was elected a senator in 1846, and became a member of the permanent war and navy commission. He was also named Privy Council by President Bulnes.

In 1846, botanist Claude Gay published Pintoa, a genus of flowering plants from Chile, belonging to the family Zygophyllaceae and named in honour of Francisco Antonio Pinto.

On July 5, 1847 he was elected president of the Senate. He was reelected as a senator on 1855. Pinto died in Santiago at the age of 72, on July 18, 1858, before the end of his mandate as senator.

References

1785 births
1858 deaths
Presidents of Chile
Heads of state of Chile
Vice presidents of Chile
Chilean Ministers of the Interior
Foreign ministers of Chile
Chilean Ministers of Defense
Chilean Army generals
Members of the Senate of Chile
Members of the Chamber of Deputies of Chile
People of the Chilean Civil War of 1829–30
People from Santiago
Presidents of the Senate of Chile
Liberal Party (Chile, 1849) politicians
Candidates for President of Chile
Chilean people of Spanish descent
Chilean people of Portuguese descent